Obrium clerulum is a species of beetle in the family Cerambycidae. It was described by Bates in 1885.

References

Obriini
Beetles described in 1885